Kulenur is a village in Haveri District, Karnataka, India. It is located 10 km from Haveri city. The river Varada passes nearby.  A co-operative sugar factory is located 1 km from Kulenur. Most of the population are involved in agriculture.

Schools and Colleges
The government of Karnataka runs two free schools for students from Kulenur and surrounding villages. HPS Kulenur and GHS Kulenur.

References 

Villages in Haveri district